Cavaliere, the Italian word for "knight" and a common surname, can refer to:

 Alik Cavaliere (1926–1998), Italian sculptor
 Felix Cavaliere (1944), American singer, songwriter, record producer, and musician
 Jake Cavaliere (1972), American musician, singer, songwriter, producer and tattoo artist
 Léopold Cavalière (1996), French basketball player 
 Massimo Cavaliere (1962), Italian fencer
 Nicholas Cavaliere (1899–1995), American cinematographer

Italian-language surnames
Surnames from status names